The Red Light District is the fourth studio album from American rapper Ludacris. The album was released on December 7, 2004, through Disturbing tha Peace and Def Jam Recordings, and was eventually certified double platinum by the RIAA. It debuted at number one on the Billboard 200 album chart with 322,000 copies sold in its first week. The album's title refers to a district in Amsterdam where prostitution is common; red-light district. The CD is accompanied by a 41-minute DVD made by Decon of Ludacris visiting the red-light district, a cannabis growroom, an adult 'cam-house' and the recording of the Red Light District CD/DVD promo concert in Amsterdam, Netherlands.

Track listing
Credits adapted from the album's liner notes.

Samples and interpolations
"Number One Spot"
"Soul Bossa Nova" by Quincy Jones

"Get Back"
Interpolation from “Fuck You Tonight” by Notorious B.I.G.

"Child of the Night"
"Portuguese Love" by Teena Marie

"Who Not Me"
Interpolation from “Stick Em” by The Fat Boys

"Large Amounts"
“Pick A Pocket Or Two” by Clive Reville

"Two Miles an Hour"
"Little Child Runnin' Wild" by Curtis Mayfield
"Summertime" by DJ Jazzy Jeff and the Fresh Prince

Chart positions

Weekly charts

Year-end charts

Certifications

See also
 List of Billboard 200 number-one albums of 2004

References

2004 albums
Ludacris albums
Disturbing tha Peace albums
Def Jam Recordings albums
Albums produced by Timbaland
Albums produced by Polow da Don
Albums produced by Salaam Remi
Albums produced by DJ Green Lantern
Albums produced by DJ Toomp
Albums produced by Organized Noize